Princeton Owusu-Ansah (born 12 August 1976) is a Ghanaian former professional footballer who played as a midfielder.

He played for Goldfields Obuasi in Ghana for the most part of his career, including one year under the new club name Ashanti Gold S.C. in 2004 before joining Nyíregyháza Spartacus in Hungary for a short spell. He was also capped for Ghana, and was a squad member in the 1997 Korea Cup, 1998 Africa Cup of Nations and the 2002 Africa Cup of Nations.

References

Living people
1976 births
Association football midfielders
Ghanaian footballers
Nemzeti Bajnokság I players
Ashanti Gold SC players
Nyíregyháza Spartacus FC players
Expatriate footballers in Greece
Ghanaian expatriate footballers
Ghanaian expatriate sportspeople in Hungary
Ghana international footballers
1998 African Cup of Nations players
2002 African Cup of Nations players
Alumni of the Accra Academy